Emilie Sandra Deal ( Dunagan; February 1, 1942 – August 23, 2022) was an American education advocate and public school language arts teacher. As the wife of Georgia's 82nd Governor, Nathan Deal, she served as the First Lady of Georgia from 2011 to 2019.

Education
The daughter of educators, Emilie Sandra Dunagan grew up in Gainesville, Georgia. She was a two time graduate of Georgia College & State University. She received her bachelor's degree in elementary education in 1963. She received her master's degree in elementary education in 1968.

Career

Before becoming the first lady of Georgia, Dunagan taught language arts at public schools for over 15 years, and retired as a sixth-grade middle-school teacher in Hall County, Georgia.  During her tenure as Georgia's first lady, she advocated for literacy and education throughout the state, for which the Georgia Association of Broadcasters awarded her their 2016 "Georgian of the Year" award.

In 2015, her book Memories of the Mansion: The Story of Georgia’s Governor’s Mansion was published. Copies of the book were donated to every public library in the state of Georgia.

In 2016, she served as the keynote speaker at Georgia Gwinnett College's summer commencement.

In 2017, Georgia College & State University unveiled the Sandra Dunagan Deal Center for Early Language and Literacy. A state-funded educational institute, the center aims to provide professional development, or training, to early elementary teachers to  improve the early language and literacy skills of Georgia's children by providing research-based professional development for organizations working with children from birth through age 8.

Personal life
Sandra Dunagan married Nathan Deal in 1966. She and Governor Deal have four children: Jason, Mary Emily, Carrie, and Katie.

Sandra Deal was diagnosed with breast cancer in January 2018. She completed radiation treatments in May 2018. On August 23, 2022, she died at her home in Demorest, aged 80, from breast cancer that had spread to her brain.

References

External links
Official Biography
Deal's Blog

1942 births
2022 deaths
First Ladies and Gentlemen of Georgia (U.S. state)
Daughters of the American Revolution people
People from Gainesville, Georgia
Georgia College & State University alumni
Education activists
Schoolteachers from Georgia (U.S. state)
American women educators
Deaths from cancer in Georgia (U.S. state)
Georgia (U.S. state) Republicans
Deaths from breast cancer
Deaths from brain cancer in the United States